Celia Bobak is an art director and set decorator. She has been nominated for two Academy Awards.

Academy Awards
Both nominations were for Best Production Design:

 77th Academy Awards – The Phantom of the Opera (shared with Anthony D. G. Pratt)
 88th Academy Awards – The Martian (shared with Arthur Max)

References

External links
 

Living people
Set decorators
Art directors
Year of birth missing (living people)
Place of birth missing (living people)